This list of Russian physicists includes the famous physicists from the Russian Empire, the Soviet Union and the Russian Federation.

Alphabetical list


A
Alexei Abrikosov, discovered how magnetic flux can penetrate a superconductor (the Abrikosov vortex), Nobel Prize winner
Franz Aepinus,  related electricity and magnetism, proved the electric nature of pyroelectricity, explained electric polarization and electrostatic induction, invented achromatic microscope
Zhores Alferov, inventor of modern heterotransistor, Nobel Prize winner
Sergey Alekseenko, director of the Kutateladze Institute of Thermophysics, Global Energy Prize recipient
Artem Alikhanian, a prominent researcher of cosmic rays, inventor of wide-gap track spark chamber
Abram Alikhanov, nuclear physicist, a prominent researcher of cosmic rays, built the first nuclear reactors in the USSR, founder of Institute for Theoretical and Experimental Physics (ITEP)
Semen Altshuler, researched EPR and NMR, predicted acoustic paramagnetic resonance
Lev Artsimovich, builder of the first tokamak, researcher of high temperature plasma
Gurgen Askaryan, predicted self focusing of light, discovered Askaryan effect in the particle physics

B
Nikolay Basov, physicist, co-inventor of laser and maser, Nobel Prize winner
Nikolay Bogolyubov, mathematician and theoretical physicist, co-developed the BBGKY hierarchy, formulated a microscopic theory of superconductivity, suggested a triplet quark model, introduced a new quantum degree of freedom (color charge)
Matvei Petrovich Bronstein, theoretical physicist, a pioneer of quantum gravity, author of works in astrophysics, semiconductors, quantum electrodynamics and cosmology.
Gersh Budker, inventor of electron cooling, co-inventor of collider

C
Sergey Chaplygin, a founder of aero- and hydrodynamics, formulated the Chaplygin's equations and Chaplygin gas concept
 Pavel Cherenkov, discoverer of Cherenkov radiation, Nobel Prize winner

D
Yuri Denisyuk, inventor of 3D holography

F
Ludvig Faddeev, discoverer of Faddeev–Popov ghosts and Faddeev equations in quantum physics
Georgy Flyorov, nuclear physicist, one of the initiators of the Soviet atomic bomb project, co-discoverer of seaborgium and bohrium, founder of the Joint Institute for Nuclear Research
Vladimir Fock, developed the Fock space, Fock state and the Hartree–Fock method in quantum mechanics
Ilya Frank, explained the phenomenon of Cherenkov radiation, Nobel Prize winner
Vsevolod Frederiks (Fréedericksz), discovered the Fréedericksz transition, the Fréedericksz critical field in liquid crystals
Yakov Frenkel, coined the term electron hole, discovered the Frenkel defect of a crystal lattice, described the Poole–Frenkel effect in solid-state physics

G
Andre Geim, inventor of graphene, developer of gecko tape, Nobel Prize winner and at the same time Ig Nobel Prize winner for diamagnetic levitation of a living frog
Vitaly Ginzburg, co-author of the Ginzburg–Landau theory of superconductivity, a developer of hydrogen bomb, Nobel Prize winner
Vladimir Gribov, introduced pomeron, DGLAP equations and Gribov ambiguity
Aleksandr Gurevich, author of the runaway breakdown theory of lightning

I
Abram Ioffe, founder of the Soviet physics school, tutor of many prominent scientists
Dmitri Ivanenko, pioneered the modelling of nuclear shell and nuclear forces, predicted synchrotron radiation, suggested the quark stars existence

J
Boris Jacobi, formulated the Maximum power theorem in electrical engineering, invented electroplating, electrotyping, galvanoplastic sculpture and electric boat

K
Pyotr Kapitsa, originated the techniques for creating ultrastrong magnetic fields, co-discovered a way to measure the magnetic field of an atomic nucleus discovered superfluidity, Nobel Prize winner
Yuly Khariton, chief designer of the Soviet atomic bomb, co-developer of the Tsar Bomb
Orest Khvolson, first to study the Chwolson ring effect of gravitational lensing
Sergey Krasnikov, developer of the Krasnikov tube, a speculative mechanism for space travel
Igor Kurchatov, builder of the first nuclear power plant, developer of the first nuclear reactors for surface ships

L
Lev Landau, theoretical physicist, developed the Ginzburg–Landau theory of superconductivity, explained the Landau damping in plasma physics, pointed out the Landau pole in quantum electrodynamics, co-author of the famous Course of Theoretical Physics, Nobel Prize winner
Grigory Landsberg, co-discoverer of Raman scattering of light
Mikhail Lavrentyev, physicist and mathematician, founded the Siberian Division of the Soviet Academy of Sciences and Akademgorodok in Novosibirsk
Pyotr Lebedev, the first to measure the radiation pressure on a solid body, thus proving the Maxwell's theory of electromagnetism
Heinrich Lenz, discovered the Lenz's law of electromagnetism
Aleksandr Il'ich Leipunskii, pioneered the development of fast breeder reactors in the USSR.
Evgeny Lifshitz, an author of the BKL singularity model of the Universe evolution, co-author of the famous Course of Theoretical Physics
Mikhail Lomonosov, polymath scientist, artist and inventor, proposed the law of conservation of matter, disproved the phlogiston theory
Oleg Losev, inventor of light-emitting diode and crystadine

M
Alexander Makarov,  inventor of orbitrap
Boris Mamyrin, inventor of reflectron
Leonid Mandelshtam, co-discoverer of the Raman effect
Stanislav Mikheyev, co-discoverer of the Mikheyev–Smirnov–Wolfenstein effect of neutrino oscillations

N

Konstantin Novoselov, inventor of graphene, developer of gecko tape, Nobel Prize winner

O
Yuri Oganessian, nuclear physicist in the Joint Institute for Nuclear Research (JINR), co-discoverer of the heaviest elements in the periodic table; element Oganesson

P
Vasily Petrov, discoverer of electric arc, proposed arc lamp and arc welding
Boris Podolsky, an author of EPR Paradox in quantum physics
Alexander Polyakov, developed the concepts of Polyakov action, 't Hooft–Polyakov monopole and BPST instanton
Isaak Pomeranchuk, predicted synchrotron radiation
Bruno Pontecorvo, a founder of neutrino high energy physics, his work led to the discovery of PMNS matrix
Alexander Popov, inventor of lightning detector, one of the inventors of radio, recorded the first experimental radiolocation at sea
Victor Popov, co-discoverer of Faddeev–Popov ghosts in quantum field theory
Alexander Prokhorov, co-inventor of laser and maser, Nobel Prize winner

R
Georg Wilhelm Richmann, inventor of electrometer, pioneer researcher of atmospheric electricity, killed by a ball lightning in experiment

S
Andrei Sakharov, co-developer of tokamak and the Tsar Bomb, inventor of explosively pumped flux compression generator, Nobel Peace Prize winner
Nikolay Semyonov, physical chemist, co-discovered a way to measure the magnetic field of an atomic nucleus, Nobel Prize in Chemistry winner
Lev Shubnikov, discoverer of Shubnikov–de Haas effect, one of the first researchers of solid hydrogen and liquid helium
Dmitri Skobeltsyn, first to use cloud chamber for studying cosmic rays, the first to observe positrons
Alexei Smirnov, co-discoverer of Mikheyev–Smirnov–Wolfenstein effect of neutrino oscillations
Arseny Sokolov, co-discoverer of Sokolov–Ternov effect, a developer of synchrotron radiation theory
Mark Stockman, optical physicist, co-discoverer of spaser
Aleksandr Stoletov, inventor of photoelectric cell, built the Stoletov curve and pioneered the research of ferromagnetism

T
Igor Tamm, explained the phenomenon of Cherenkov radiation, co-developer of tokamak, Nobel Prize winner
Karen Ter-Martirosian, theoretical physicist, known for his contributions to quantum mechanics and quantum field theory, founder of the Elementary Particle Physics chair of the Moscow Institute of Physics and Technology
Igor Ternov, co-discoverer of Sokolov–Ternov effect of synchrotron radiation

U
Nikolay Umov, discovered the Umov-Poynting vector and Umov effect, the first to propose the formula 
Petr Ufimtsev, developed the theory that led to modern stealth technology

V
Sergey Vavilov, co-discoverer of Cherenkov radiation, formulated the Kasha–Vavilov rule of quantum yields
Vladimir Veksler, inventor of synchrophasotron, co-inventor of synchrotron
Evgeny Velikhov, leader of the international program ITER (thermonuclear experimental tokamak)
Anatoly Vlasov, developed the Vlasov equation in plasma physics

Y
Alexey Yekimov, discoverer of quantum dots

Z
Yevgeny Zavoisky, inventor of EPR spectroscopy, co-developer of NMR spectroscopy
Yakov Zel'dovich, physicist and cosmologist, predicted the beta decay of a pi meson and the muon catalysis, co-predicted the Sunyaev–Zel'dovich effect of CMB distortion
Nikolai Zhukovsky, a founder of aero- and hydrodynamics, the first to study airflow, author of Joukowsky transform and Kutta–Joukowski theorem, founder of TsAGI and pioneer of aviation

See also
List of physicists
List of Russian astronomers and astrophysicists
List of Russian mathematicians
List of Russian scientists
List of Russian inventors
Science and technology in Russia

References

Russian
 
Physicists